Sylvie Boucher (born December 18, 1962 in Victoriaville, Quebec) is a Canadian politician who was served as the Member of Parliament (MP) for the riding of Beauport—Limoilou from 2006 to 2011 and as the MP for Beauport—Côte-de-Beaupré—Île d'Orléans—Charlevoix from 2015 to 2019. She is a member of the Conservative Party.

Background

Boucher has studied office systems technology, gerontology, information technology, and literature. Before politics, she worked in the private sector and specialized in marketing and sales. She has also worked in the National Assembly of Quebec with various jobs and has served as Assistant Chief of Staff to the Canadian Minister of Tourism.

Federal politics

Boucher was elected Member of Parliament for the riding of Beauport—Limoilou, Quebec in the 2006 election by a margin of 820 votes over her Bloc Québécois opponent.

On February 7, 2006, Boucher was appointed as parliamentary secretary to Prime Minister Stephen Harper. On April 10, 2007 she also became Parliamentary Secretary for La Francophonie and Official Languages. On October 10, 2007 she was appointed Parliamentary Secretary to the Prime Minister and for Status of Women. She was re-elected in the 2008 election, but was defeated in the 2011 election by Raymond Côté of the New Democratic Party.

She returned to parliament in the 2015 election and defeated incumbent Jonathan Tremblay in the new riding of Beauport—Côte-de-Beaupré—Île d'Orléans—Charlevoix. She was defeated in the 2019 election.

Electoral record

References

Sources 
Sylvie Boucher article at ctv.ca

External links
 

1962 births
Women members of the House of Commons of Canada
Conservative Party of Canada MPs
Living people
Members of the House of Commons of Canada from Quebec
People from Victoriaville
Women in Quebec politics
21st-century Canadian politicians
21st-century Canadian women politicians